Richard McIver (June 14, 1941 – March 9, 2013) was a member of the Seattle City Council. He was selected from 114 applicants to fill a vacancy on the Council in January 1997, was elected to the position that fall, and was reelected in 2001 and 2005. As of October 2007 he was chair of the Finance & Budget and Budget Committees, vice-chair of the Economic Development & Neighborhoods Committee, and a member of the Housing, Human Services & Health Committee.

In his 2001 campaign, he defeated music critic, monorail booster and author Grant Cogswell. In a film about that campaign, Grassroots, McIver was played by Cedric the Entertainer.

McIver chaired the City Council's Housing & Economic Development Committee.  He was vice-chair of the Environment, Emergency Management and Utilities Committee and was a member of the Transportation Committee.  He was an alternate member of the Energy & Technology Committee.  (From 2004 through 2007 he was the chair of the Council's Budget & Finance Committee.)

McIver was strongly identified with Rainier Valley, one of Seattle's poorer neighborhoods. According to at least one obituary, his greatest achievement in office was the creation of a $50 million Rainier Valley Community Development Fund, and he was "deeply worried" about Link light rail impacting "immigrant- and minority-owned businesses along Rainier Avenue."

During the protests surrounding the Seattle World Trade Organization Ministerial Conference of 1999, McIver, on his way to an official dinner, was, according to fellow councilmember Jean Godden, "stopped by a Seattle policeman who did not recognize him as a council member, refused to believe he was a public official, and insisted on making him stand spreadeagled up against his car." "He never forgot that, not so much because of the indignity to him, but that others did not believe an African American might be a city councilmember."

In February 2009, McIver announced his decision to not seek reelection.

McIver died on March 9, 2013, at the age of 71 in Seattle.

Domestic violence charges and ethics violation

On October 10, 2007, McIver was arrested at his South Seattle home on domestic violence charges following an altercation that occurred with his wife early that morning. Charges were subsequently dropped as his wife refused to testify.

In May 2008 McIver was accused by Seattle's Ethics office of violating the city's conflict-of-interest law by awarding a $37,000 no-bid contract to a company affiliated with a longtime friend who has hosted the council member's annual vacations to a Virgin Islands condominium.  McIver stated that he had "declined to pay a settlement penalty presented by the Ethics and Elections Commission executive director and [he] intend[ed] to vigorously challenge these baseless charges." McIver paid the $1,000 fine using tax dollars.

References

Seattle City Council members
2013 deaths
1941 births
African-American people in Washington (state) politics
20th-century African-American people
21st-century African-American people